Max Steel: Covert Missions (also simply known as Max Steel) is a video game developed by Treyarch and published by Mattel Interactive, based on the television series and action figure of the same name. It was released for the Dreamcast exclusively in North America on November 6, 2000. A version planned for the Game Boy Color was cancelled.

As with the TV series, Christian Campbell voiced Max Steel.

Plot
Infused with superhuman powers and nano-technology, Max Steel battles the evil forces of D.R.E.A.D and his evil cyborg nemesis Psycho. Now, armed with a fierce new bio-weapon, D.R.E.A.D plans to ravage and take over the world.

Reception

The game received "mixed" reviews according to the review aggregation website Metacritic. Jeremy Dunham of IGN said, "Max Steel is easily one of the most disappointing games of the year!" and "Max Steel should be at the bottom of everyone's wish lists (or steel-toed boots, whichever you prefer)." Luke Barnes of AllGame said, "Regrettably, Max Steel completely misses the mark when it comes to the simple concept of "enjoyment."" On a positive note, he praised the game's graphics and soundtrack. Kevin Rice of NextGen said of the game, "While it's definitely fun and there's very little to complain about, it's all got a passé feel. It's fast-paced and it looks good, but it's nothing that hasn't been done before."

References

External links
 

2000 video games
Dreamcast games
Dreamcast-only games
Max Steel
Third-person shooters
Treyarch games
Video games based on animated television series
Video games developed in the United States
Single-player video games
Mattel video games
Sony Pictures video games
Cancelled Game Boy Advance games
North America-exclusive video games